B'z Live in Nanba is the seventh live VHS/DVD released by Japanese rock duo B'z, on February 20, 2008. It features live footage of their show at Namba, Osaka.

Track listing 
ALL-OUT ATTACK
juice

Real Thing Shakes
DEVIL
Brighter Day
TAK'S SOLO

HOME
MONSTER

LOVE PHANTOM

SPLASH!
RUN

Certifications

References 
 Official release site

External links 
B'z Official Website 

B'z video albums
2008 video albums
Live video albums
2008 live albums